Miss Universe 2019 was the 68th Miss Universe pageant, held at the Stage 1 of the Tyler Perry Studios in Atlanta, Georgia, United States on 8 December 2019.

At the end of the event, Catriona Gray of the Philippines crowned Zozibini Tunzi of South Africa as Miss Universe 2019. It is South Africa's third win after 1978 and their recent victory in 2017. This edition also saw the crowning of the first black woman from the country to win and the first since Leila Lopes of Angola in 2011.

Contestants from 90 countries and territories participated in this year's pageant. The pageant was hosted by Steve Harvey in his fifth consecutive year, with Miss Universe 2012 Olivia Culpo and Vanessa Lachey as backstage correspondents. Ally Brooke performed in this year's pageant.

The competition also featured the debut of the new Mouawad Power of Unity crown, crafted in 18-karat gold and 1,770 diamonds, including a shield-cut golden canary diamond at the center weighing at 62.83 carats. The crown is said to be worth $5 million.

Background

Location and date
In December 2018, Filipino politician and businessman Chavit Singson of the LCS Group of Companies, who financed Miss Universe 2016, stated that the 2019 edition of the pageant would be in Seoul, South Korea, which previously hosted Miss Universe 1980. He added that he would assist in preparations for the competition in South Korea, although the details were not finalized; the Miss Universe Organization had never confirmed this.

Later, in April 2019, it was reported that both the Philippines and Rio de Janeiro, Brazil were reportedly interested in hosting the competition. Interest in the Philippines grew following the win of Filipino Catriona Gray in Miss Universe 2018, looking to have her crown her successor in her home country, much like Pia Wurtzbach did at Miss Universe 2016. Meanwhile, Rio de Janeiro will be declared the World Capital of Architecture by UNESCO for 2020, and is reportedly looking to host more international events in the city in anticipation of this title. In August 2019, Israel was also reportedly interested in hosting the competition. With a plan created by producers Danny Benaim and Assaf Blecher, talks regarding hosting the competition in Israel emerged after Tel Aviv successfully hosted the Eurovision Song Contest 2019. They stated that Israel was also interested in hosting the pageant on next two years. The country later hosted the 2021 pageant in Eilat.

In May 2019, Richelle Singson-Michael, the daughter of Chavit Singson, stated that the Philippines was one of several countries bidding to host the 2019 competition, and that her family's business LCS Group was committed to hosting either in the Philippines or in South Korea.

On 31 October 2019, the Miss Universe Organization confirmed that the competition would be at Tyler Perry Studios in Atlanta, Georgia on 8 December 2019.

Selection of participants
Contestants from 90 countries and territories were selected to compete in the pageant. Six of these delegates were appointees to their national titles and another was selected after another national pageant was held to replace the original dethroned winner.

Angeline Flor Pua, Miss Belgium 2018, was appointed to represent Belgium after Elena Castro Suarez, Miss Belgium 2019, chose to compete at Miss World 2019. Maëva Coucke, Miss France 2018, was appointed to the title by the Miss France organization after Vaimalama Chaves, Miss France 2019, opted not to compete in an international pageant. Vartika Singh of India, who previously represented India at Miss Grand International 2015, was appointed to represent India by the Miss Diva organization. Olga Buława, Miss Polski 2018 was selected to represent Poland by the Miss Polski organization after the Miss Polonia organization relinquished the franchise. Fiona Tenuta of Uruguay was appointed by Osmel Sousa, the national director of Miss Universe Uruguay, through a casting process after they could not find enough sponsors to hold an actual competition. Hoàng Thị Thùy, the first runner-up at the Miss Universe Vietnam 2017 pageant, was appointed to represent Vietnam following an internal selection by Dương Trương Thiên Lý, the country's national director.

Anyella Grados originally was supposed to represent Peru at Miss Universe. However, Grados was dethroned following a scandal where videos of her surfaced showing being severely drunk and vomiting in public. Due to the dethronement of Grados, a special edition of Miss Peru 2019 took place to select the new representative of Peru to Miss Universe. Kelin Rivera emerged victoriously as the new Miss Peru 2019.

The 2019 edition saw the debuts of Bangladesh and Equatorial Guinea and the returns of Lithuania, Romania, Sierra Leone and Tanzania. Lithuania last competed in 2014, Sierra Leone in 2016, and the others in 2017. Ghana, Greece, Guatemala, Hungary, Kyrgyzstan, Lebanon, Russia, Sri Lanka, Switzerland and Zambia withdrew. Before the pageant, the Miss Universe Ghana organization was suspended temporarily and will resume operations in 2020. Erika Kolani of Greece was unable to compete for undisclosed reasons. Lebanon withdrew from the competition after the Miss Lebanon 2019 competition was continuously postponed and ultimately canceled due to the 2019–20 Lebanese protests. Alina Sanko, Miss Russia 2019, was originally going to be sent to both Miss Universe and Miss World 2019, but was unable to do so due to overlapping dates. The Miss Russia organization was unable to finalize replacement plans for Miss Universe due to the length of time it took for the Miss Universe Organization to publish details about its date and venue, making it difficult for the Russian entrant to receive an American visa. However, Sanko competed in Miss Universe the following year. Zambia withdrew from the competition after Didia Mukwala, Miss Universe Zambia 2019, and the Miss Universe Zambia organization failed to book Mukwala's trip to Atlanta due to the Miss Universe Zambia organization's financial situation. Guatemala, Hungary, Sri Lanka, and Switzerland withdrew after their respective organizations failed to hold a national competition or appoint a delegate.

Swe Zin Htet of Myanmar became the first openly lesbian to compete in Miss Universe after coming out days before finals night.

Results

Placements

Special awards

Pageant

Format 
Same with 2018, twenty semifinalists were chosen through the preliminary competition— composed of the swimsuit and evening gown competitions and closed-door interviews. After a two-year absence, Internet voting returned, with the public being able to vote a candidate into the top twenty through online voting. The continental format returned for the third year, with five semifinalists from the Americas, Europe, Africa & Asia-Pacific, and wildcards coming from any continental region. The top twenty competed in the opening statement round, introduced in 2018, featuring each semifinalist giving a short introduction to themselves and their platforms. Afterward, ten semifinalists advanced to compete in the swimsuit and evening gown rounds. From ten, five finalists were chosen to compete in the first question and answer round, where each entrant answered a different question about a politicized topic. From this round, the final three was picked, who then competed in the final word, each answering the same question about women's empowerment. The three finalists also gave their closing statements before the coronation. It is the first time the closing statement round was used, replacing the final walk portion.

Selection committee 
Gaby Espino – Venezuelan actress
Sazan Hendrix – American businesswoman and social media personality
Riyo Mori – Miss Universe 2007 from Japan
Cara Mund – Miss America 2018 from North Dakota
Bozoma Saint John – American businesswoman and marketing executive
Crystle Stewart – Miss USA 2008 from Texas
Paulina Vega – Miss Universe 2014 from Colombia
Olivia Jordan – Miss USA 2015 from Oklahoma (only as preliminary judge)

Contestants
90 contestants competed for the title.

Notes

References

External links

Miss Universe official website

2019
2019 beauty pageants
2019 in Georgia (U.S. state)
2019 in the United States
Beauty pageants in the United States
December 2019 events in the United States